Bruno Mbanangoyé Zita (born 15 July 1980) is a Gabonese former football who played as a midfielder. He was a member of the Gabon national team.

Career
Zita began his career with Petrosport and joined in summer 2001 with AS Djerba. After four years with AS Djerba signed in summer 2005 with ES Zarzis. Zita left after five years Tunisia and signed with Belarusian club Dinamo Minsk in January 2006. Zita signed a two-year contract with Turkish side Sivasspor on 31 August 2009.

Zita re-signed with Dinamo Minsk in January 2011. He represented the Gabon national team at the 2012 African Cup of Nations, during which Gabon, as hosts of the competition, reached the quarter-finals.

References

External links 

1980 births
Living people
Gabonese footballers
People from Ogooué-Maritime Province
Association football midfielders
Gabon international footballers
2000 African Cup of Nations players
2010 Africa Cup of Nations players
2012 Africa Cup of Nations players
Gabonese expatriate footballers
Expatriate footballers in Tunisia
Expatriate footballers in Belarus
Expatriate footballers in Turkey
Gabonese expatriate sportspeople in Tunisia
Gabonese expatriate sportspeople in Turkey
Süper Lig players
Petrosport F.C. players
AS Djerba players
ES Zarzis players
FC Dinamo Minsk players
Sivasspor footballers
Missile FC players
FC 105 Libreville players
21st-century Gabonese people